Mar Azul is an album by the Cape Verdean musician Cesária Évora. It was released by Lusafrica in 1991.

The album consists of morna and coladeira songs. It was produced by José Da Silva. Mar Azul was one of Évora's favorites of her albums.

Track listing

References

External links

Cesária Évora albums
1991 albums
Portuguese-language albums